Bebearia bouyeri is a species of butterfly of the family Nymphalidae. It is found in Cameroon.

References

Butterflies described in 2007
bouyeri
Endemic fauna of Cameroon
Butterflies of Africa